SS Corinthic was a British cargo steamship. She was built on Teesside in 1924, sailed in a number of convoys in the Second World War, survived an overwhelming German attack on Convoy SC 7 October 1940, but was sunk by a German U-boat off West Africa in April 1941.

Early career
Irvine's Shipbuilding and Dry Dock Co Ltd of Middleton Shipyard, West Hartlepool built Corinthic for W.H. Cockerline & Co, who registered her in Hull. She was launched in 1924 and completed in June of that year. The boilers fed a three-cylinder triple expansion steam engine built by Richardsons Westgarth & Company of West Hartlepool that was rated at 442 NHP and drove a single screw.

World War II service
In the Second World War Corinthic sailed in convoys for protection against German naval and air attacks. She was part of Convoy SC 7, which sailed from Sydney, Nova Scotia for Liverpool on 5 October 1940. The convoy was overwhelmed by U-boats in a wolfpack attack, losing 20 out of its 35 merchant ships. Corinthic, carrying a cargo of steel and scrap metal, was one of the minority that survived.

Sinking
Early in 1941 Corinthic left the river port of Rosario in northern Argentina with Captain Townson Ridley as her Master and carrying a cargo of 7,710 tons of grain. On 13 April 1941 she was southwest of Freetown in Sierra Leone, West Africa, when , commanded by Kapitänleutnant Georg-Wilhelm Schulz, hit her with one torpedo at 2229 hours. The damage stopped her but she did not sink, so Schulz fired a second torpedo at 2244 hrs. This was a dud, so at 2254 hrs he fired a third torpedo, after which Corinthic sank and two members of her crew were killed. Captain Ridley, 36 officers and men and two DEMS gunners successfully abandoned ship. The Dutch motor tanker Malvina rescued them and landed them at Freetown.

Footnotes

References

1924 ships
Maritime incidents in April 1941
Ships sunk by German submarines in World War II
Steamships of the United Kingdom
World War II merchant ships of the United Kingdom
World War II shipwrecks in the Atlantic Ocean
Ships built on the River Tees